Manfred Bruns (1934, Linz am Rhein – 22 October 2019) was a federal prosecutor at the Federal Court of Justice of Germany, and a famous German gay civil rights activist. He was until 2016 a member of the Board of Directors of the Lesbian and Gay Association (LSVD).
	
He received the 2002 Magnus Hirschfeld Medal.

References

1934 births
2019 deaths
German LGBT rights activists
Jurists from Rhineland-Palatinate
People from Stuttgart
Officers Crosses of the Order of Merit of the Federal Republic of Germany
German agnostics
German prosecutors